Savchenko  (Ukrainian and ) is a surname of Ukrainian origin. It may refer to the following people:

 Aleksei Savchenko (born 1975), Russian footballer
 Aliona Savchenko (born 1984), German-Ukrainian pair skater
 Anastasia Savchenko (born 1989), Russian pole vaulter
 Andriy Savchenko (ice hockey) (born 1972), Ukrainian ice hockey player
 Andriy Savchenko (footballer) (born 1994), Ukrainian footballer
 Boris Savchenko (born 1986), Russian chess grandmaster
 Filipp Savchenko (born 1991), Russian ice hockey player
 Gleb Savchenko (born 1983), Russian dancer and choreographer
 Igor Savchenko (1906–1950), Soviet-Ukrainian filmmaker
 Ivan Savchenko (1908–1999), Soviet KGB general
 Larisa Neiland, née Savchenko (born 1966), Soviet and Latvian tennis player
 Mikhail Savchenko (born 1980), Ukrainian-Russian footballer
 Nadiya Savchenko (born 1981), Ukrainian military pilot and politician
 Oleksandr Savchenko (born 1957), Ukrainian politician
 Oleksiy Savchenko (born 1993), Ukrainian footballer
 Oxana Savchenko (born 1990), Russian Paralympic swimmer
 Roman Savchenko (born 1986), Kazakhstani ice hockey player
 Ruslan Savchenko (born 1971), Ukrainian weightlifter
 Sergey Savchenko (born 1949), Ukrainian artist
 Stanislav Savchenko (born 1967), Ukrainian chess grandmaster
 Victor A. Savchenko (born 1961), Ukrainian historian and writer
 Viktor Savchenko (born 1952), Soviet-Ukrainian boxer
 Viktor Savchenko (athlete) (born 1948), Ukrainian hurdler
 Volodymyr Ivanovych Savchenko (1933–2005), Soviet-Ukrainian science fiction writer
 Volodymyr Mykolayovych Savchenko (born 1973), Ukrainian footballer
 Yekaterina Savchenko (born 1977), Russian high jumper
 Yevgeny Savchenko (born 1950), Russian politician

See also
 
 Savchenkov
 Shevchenko

Ukrainian-language surnames
Surnames of Ukrainian origin